"The Three Bs" is a term derived from an expression coined by Peter Cornelius in 1854, which added Hector Berlioz as the third B to occupy the heights already occupied by Johann Sebastian Bach and Ludwig van Beethoven. Later in the century, conductor Hans von Bülow substituted Johannes Brahms for Berlioz. The phrase is generally used in discussions of classical music to refer to the supposed primacy of Bach, Beethoven, and Brahms in the field.

Origins
Decades later, Bülow composed the following pun to a friend: "Mein musikalisches Glaubensbekenntniss steht in Es dur, mit drei B-en in der Vorzeichnung: Bach, Beethoven, und Brahms!" B, in German, stands for the note B as well as for the flat sign. The remark may be translated, roughly, as "My musical creed is in the key of E-flat major, and contains three Bs [flats] in its key signature: Bach, Beethoven, and Brahms!" Bülow had been attracted to the idea of a sort of Holy Trinity of classical music for a number of years, writing in the 1880s: "I believe in Bach, the Father, Beethoven, the Son, and Brahms, the Holy Ghost of music". He further linked Beethoven and Brahms by referring to the latter's First Symphony as Beethoven's Tenth (though Brahms disliked the comparison, thinking it implied plagiarism rather than the homage he had intended). Niccolò Paganini had even earlier (1838) identified Berlioz as the worthy successor of Beethoven. Indeed, Hans von Bülow, two years before Cornelius' article, had himself called Berlioz "the immediate and most energetic successor of Beethoven". David Matthews has suggested that if there was a "Fourth B" added to this legacy, it could be Benjamin Britten.

In popular culture
 In a Peanuts strip (published February 22, 1952), when Schroeder is seen composing on the piano, Charlie Brown says "You've heard of Bach, Brahms, and Beethoven, right? Well from now on it's going to be Schubert, Schumann, and Schroeder."

References

Citations

Sources 
 
 
 
 
 

English phrases
Trios
Johann Sebastian Bach
Ludwig van Beethoven
Hector Berlioz
Johannes Brahms